Francis Hall may refer to:

 Francis Hall, alias of the Jesuit priest Francis Line (1595–1675)
 Francis Hall (Japan) (1822–1902), American businessman in Japan
 Francis Hall (MP) (died 1534), English Member of Parliament for Grantham
 Francis B. Hall (1827–1903), Union Army soldier
 Francis de Havilland Hall (1847–1929), English physician
 Frances Elliott Mann Hall (1853–1935), American teacher
 Francis J. Hall (1857–1932), American Episcopal theologian
 Francis Richard Hall (1862–1939), Australian architect
 Francis William Hall (1871–?), lawyer and political figure in Ontario
 Francis Hall (priest) (fl. 1795–1803), Anglican priest in Ireland 
 Francis George Hall (1860–1901), British administrator in East Africa
 Francis Hall, engineer for the Shubenacadie Canal

See also
 Frank Hall (disambiguation)